San Nicolás is the Spanish name for Saint Nicholas, and may refer to:

People
Michael F.Q. San Nicolas, a Guamanian politician
Moisés San Nicolás, an Andorran footballer

Places

Argentina 
 San Nicolás de los Arroyos, in the province of Buenos Aires
 San Nicolás Agreement, signed there
 San Nicolás, Buenos Aires, a neighborhood in the city of Buenos Aires
 San Nicolás, La Rioja
 San Nicolás Partido (province of Buenos Aires)

Aruba 
 San Nicolaas
 San Nicolas Bay Reef Islands

Chile 
 San Nicolás, Chile, a village and commune in Punilla Province, Ñuble Region

Costa Rica 
 San Nicolás District, Cartago; see districts of Costa Rica

Cuba 
 San Nicolás de Bari, province of Mayabeque

Honduras 
 San Nicolás, Copán
 San Nicolás, Santa Bárbara

Mexico 
 San Nicolás de Carretas (Chihuahua))
 San Nicolás de los Garza (Nuevo León)
 San Nicolás de Los Ranchos (Puebla)
 San Nicolás Buenos Aires (Puebla)
 San Nicolás Hidalgo (Oaxaca)
 San Nicolás Tolentino (San Luis Potosí)
 San Nicolás, Baja California
 San Nicolás, Jalisco
 San Nicolás, Oaxaca
 San Nicolás, Puebla
 San Nicolás, Tamaulipas

Nicaragua 
 San Nicolás, Estelí

Philippines 
 San Nicolas, Batangas
 San Nicolas, Ilocos Norte
 San Nicolas, Manila
 San Nicolas, Pangasinan
 San Nicolas, Canaman, Camarines Sur

Peru 
 San Nicolás District, Rodríguez de Mendoza (Amazonas)
 San Nicolás District, Carlos Fermín Fitzcarrald (Ancash)

Spain 
 La Aldea de San Nicolás, Canaries
 St Nicholas' Church, Madrid
 Pamplona, Navarre
 St Nicholas' Church, Pamplona, a medieval church
 San Nicolás (Pamplona borough), a medieval borough
 San Nicolás del Puerto (Andalusia)

United States 
 San Nicolas Island, one of California's Channel Islands

Ships 
HMS San Nicolas, Royal Navy ship, formerly Spanish navy ship San Nicolás, captured at the Battle of Cape St Vincent in 1797
, Panamanian cargo ship in service 1949–64, formerly German ship SS Claus Rickmers
 SS San Nicolas, a Lake tanker sunk by the German Submarine U-502 on 16-Feb-1942

See also
Church of San Nicolás (disambiguation)
Nicholas of Tolentino, for the Italian saint known as San Nicolas de Tolentino
Nicholas of Tolentino (disambiguation)